Laval Short (born September 29, 1958) is a former American football defensive tackle. He played for the Denver Broncos in 1980, the Tampa Bay Buccaneers in 1981, the Denver Gold in 1983 and for the Pittsburgh Maulers in 1984.

References

1958 births
Living people
American football defensive tackles
Colorado Buffaloes football players
Denver Broncos players
Tampa Bay Buccaneers players
Denver Gold players
Pittsburgh Maulers players